The Goa Konkani Akademi (Goa Academy of Letters for Konkani) is an organization set up by the Government of Goa in 1986 to promote the Konkani in Goa. Its stated aim is to accelerate the pace of development of Konkani by encouraging writers, researchers, etc. and to bring Konkanis from all areas together.

Nature
The Goa Konkani Akademi was founded on 4 March 1986. It is an autonomous body and has jurisdiction over the state of Goa. It undertakes activities for the development and promotion of Konkani. GKA receives grants from the Government of Goa.

The current Akademi President is Pundalik Naik (2002–present). Past presidents were Purushottam Kakodkar (1984-1996) and Uday Bhembre (1996-2002) respectively.

Aims and objectives
The Akademi was built with the purpose of promoting  the growth of Konkani. Some of the major goals stated on its website are:
To initiate, assist or undertake implementation of projects or schemes of research in the field of Konkani language, literature and culture. 
To initiate, assist or undertake publication in Konkani language, the results of such research. 
To initiate, assist or undertake publication in Konkani language of original and erudite papers, monographs, books, journal, as also of any other works in any other branch of knowledge.

The GKA carries out its activities under directions issued to it by the Government of Goa. It also assists the state Government in formulating various policies in regard to Konkani.

Activities
The GKA conducts various activities
Providing financial assistance(75% of cost) to the first book by a new author.
Provides 50% financial assistance to publishers and purchases 100 copies of each book.
Section on folklore
Has undertaken a project to publish a dictionary-cum-encyclopedia in Konkani.
Conducts a "Knowledge of Konkani" certificate test which is necessary for Government Jobs in Goa. Also has other certificate exams.
Has organized a five-day annual cultural event since 1993.

Organization structure
The Organization has various sections
Education Section: Post-graduate and certificate courses; teacher training
Lexicon Section: Creation of Konkani encyclopedia and dictionaries
Folklore Section: collection of various media related to folklore
Literature Section: Oversees various publication schemes
Cultural Section: Drama, tiatr(theatre) and documentaries.

Leadership
Following have been the Presidents of the GKA, since its inception.

Criticism
The GKA has been accused of being biased against Konkani publications in the Roman script in the past. Another demand has been that the GKA should be headed by persons of both the major communities in Goa (Hindus and Christians) by rotation.

In March 2017, three prominent members of the GKA committee—Chairman Madhav Borkar, Vice Chairman Jose Lourenco and member Kamlakar Mhalshi—quit their posts "citing issues in receiving funds from the government to conduct various Konkani language promotion programmes."

There have been controversies over the some books that the GKA has turned down or declined to support.

The GKA has a book publishing programme, but visibility of the books produced is seen as probably insufficient to what could be possible. One reason could be the "low-price, no-distributor-margins policy" as being responsible for the lack of interest by distributors, and hence low readership of its books.

Location
The Goa Konkani Akademi's office is situated at Patto Colony, Panaji, Goa.

See also
 Konkani language

References

External links
 Goa Konkani Akademi website

Konkani
Linguistic research institutes
Organisations based in Goa
State agencies of Goa
Linguistic research in India
Organizations established in 1986
1986 establishments in Goa, Daman and Diu